Santos Futebol Clube ( Santos Football Club), also known as Santos  and familiarly as Peixe, is a Brazilian professional karate club, based in Santos, Brazil. Karate has been a practice within the club since 1982. Santos partnered with the Academia Resistência, with classes taught by Master Paulo Bartolo, deputy director of Santos. Bartolo has in his curriculum titles as the International Christmas Tournament (1996), the Fourth Annual Champions Invitational - Miami (1998) and the Florida Sunshine Cup - Miami. The sensei was also coach of the Brazilian in the World Cup in South Africa (1996). The Academy is the resistance Ana Costa Avenue, No. 541 - set from 62nd to 5th floor - at Gonzaga, Santos.

References

External links
 Official website

Sports clubs established in 1912
Brazilian martial arts
Santos FC
1912 establishments in Brazil